Camp Marlboro was a U.S. Military Camp in Sadr City, Baghdad.  It was built to facilitate military and peacekeeping operations in the densely populated Shia ghetto.

Camp Marlboro was named as such because it was located on the premises of a cigarette factory, run by one of Saddam Hussein's cousins until the US forces occupied the compound. Marlboro is an American cigarette brand.

External links
Camp Marlboro from GlobalSecurity.org

Installations of the United States Army in Iraq
2003 establishments in Iraq